The Rainbow Conoco at 400 Main St. in Shelby, Montana, also known as Joe's, was built in 1936.  It was listed on the National Register of Historic Places in 1994.

It was a gas and car repair station designed by Continental Oil Co. architects as an "English cottage-type station".  The design included a steeply pitched gable roof with dark green asphalt shingles, contrasting to the off-white glazed brick exterior.  It was built in 1936 and expanded in the same style, to add a second service bay, in 1941.  A  flat roof expansion which does not match was added in 1975 when Joe Kincaid took over operation.  Twenty-eight years later in 1993, Kincaid still operated the station.

It was deemed significant as "one of finest examples of 1930s era gas station design in Montana" and as "the best original domestic, English cottage design remaining in the State. The styling reflected the desire to avoid conflict with nearby residential environments and blend effectively with adjacent commercial structures. The beautifully maintained glazed brick exterior is accentuated with natural brick trim around windows and doors in the classic 1930s style. The high-pitched gable roof and distinctive white and green color scheme made the station a familiar and recognizable landmark."

See also 
 Continental Oil Company Building: NRHP-listed Conoco bulk storage complex in Cheyenne, Wyoming
 Continental Oil Company Filling Station: NRHP-listed Conoco gas station in Kalispell, Montana
 Jackson Conoco Service Station: NRHP-listed Conoco gas station in El Reno, Oklahoma
 Hughes Conoco Service Station: NRHP-listed Conoco gas station in Topeka, Kansas
 Huning Highlands Conoco Service Station: NRHP-listed Conoco gas station in Albuquerque, New Mexico
 Spraker Service Station: NRHP-listed Conoco gas station in Vinita, Oklahoma

References

National Register of Historic Places in Toole County, Montana
Commercial buildings completed in 1936
Gas stations on the National Register of Historic Places in Montana
ConocoPhillips
1936 establishments in Montana